Ralph Robert Scott (July 25, 1947 – October 30, 2011) was a left-handed specialist pitcher in North American Major League Baseball (MLB) who played in portions of five seasons with the Baltimore Orioles, Montreal Expos and California Angels from 1972 to 1977. He was born in Weimar, East Germany.

Career
Scott was selected out of Newburgh Free Academy by the New York Yankees in the 17th round (328th overall) of the 1965 Major League Baseball Draft. He was the first high school baseball player drafted out of the Mid-Hudson region of the Hudson Valley by any MLB club. He was traded to the Chicago White Sox for Pete Ward on December 18, 1969.

He also spent nine seasons in the Minor leagues, mostly for the Rochester Red Wings of the International League. In 1971, he  collected a 9–1 record with nine saves and a 3.38 earned run average in 54 games for manager Joe Altobelli's pennant-winning and Governors' Cup winning-team. He had an even better season for Rochester in 1974, when he was 8–2 with 17 saves and a 0.99 ERA in 57 games.

In a nine-year minors career, he posted a 60–32 record with 46 saves and a 3.20 ERA in 297 pitching appearances.

He was elected to the Red Wings Hall of Fame in 1998, along with Allie Clark, Frank Horton and Al Weber.

He spent a year in the United States Army in 1967 where he played baseball at Fort Leonard Wood, Missouri.

Personal life
Scott met his eventual wife, Linda Brown, while he was playing for the Binghamton Triplets and she was a sophomore at Ithaca College. They had a son, Kevin, in 1970 or 1971. After Kevin began school, Scott stopped playing winter baseball in Latin America and began spending offseasons with his family in Binghamton, New York.

Scott died in Binghamton in 2011 at the age of 64.

References

External links

1947 births
2011 deaths
Major League Baseball pitchers
Baltimore Orioles players
California Angels players
Montreal Expos players
Binghamton Triplets players
Charlotte O's players
Columbus Clippers players
Fort Lauderdale Yankees players
Miami Amigos players
Rochester Red Wings players
Syracuse Chiefs players
Major League Baseball players from Germany
Sportspeople from Weimar
American expatriate baseball players in Canada
Florida Instructional League Yankees players
Sportspeople from Newburgh, New York
Baseball players from New York (state)
United States Army soldiers
American expatriate baseball players in Venezuela
Newburgh Free Academy alumni